Transylvanian Landler is a German dialect of the Transylvanian Landler community who lives in Sibiu County in southern Transylvania, central Romania. Transylvanian Landler is a southern dialect of the German language and has many linguistic features in common with Bavarian. It is estimated that approximately 1,500 people speak this dialect of German at a native level.

Geographical location 

Traditionally, it has been spoken in several communes situated in Sibiu County where in the past Austrian Protestants (more specifically Evangelical Lutherans) expelled from Salzkammergut area were allowed to settle. These communes are: Großau, Großpold, and Neppendorf.

The ancestors of the Transylvanian Landlers stem from Upper Austria, Styria, and Carinthia. The Transylvanian Landler dialect was also spoken by 40 native speakers in Sebeș, Alba County in the past. Consequently, the Transylvanian Landlers were surrounded mostly by Romanian speakers and Transylvanian Saxons (which subsequently influenced their dialect as well).

The Transylvanian Landler community has been living in Sibiu County since the mid 18th century onwards. It is considered an endangered German dialect as it is mostly spoken by 200 older people in Transylvania and a few hundred in Germany. Aside from Transylvanian Landler, the Transylvanian Landlers also speak:

 Standard German (i.e. Hochdeutsch);
 Transylvanian Saxon;
 Romanian.

Number of speakers in the past 

In the past, during the early 20th century and more specifically during the 1930s, it is estimated that the total number of Transylvanian Landler speakers in their three rural communities in southern Transylvania peaked at 6,000. This number, however, has gradually dwindled to a very tiny minority to the present-day, when it is estimated that this German dialect is spoken by approximately 1,500 people worldwide.

Multilingualism 

All Transylvanian Landlers speak Transylvanian Saxon and standard German (i.e. Hochdeutsch), aside from their dialect. They also speak Romanian.

Notes

References 

Transylvania
Languages of Romania
Romanian people of Austrian descent
Romanian people of German descent
Ethnic German groups in Romania
German dialects